Palimbolus foveicornis is a beetle in the Staphylinidae (rove beetle) family, which is found in New South Wales and Queensland, east of the divide.

It was first described by Arthur Mills Lea in 1911.

Description
Lea describes the species:

References 

Beetles described in 1911
Taxa named by Arthur Mills Lea
Pselaphinae